Celebrando Al Príncipe (Celebrating the Prince) is a compilation album by Mexican pop singer Cristian Castro released by Universal Music Latino on November 13, 2012. The album follows the productions ofViva el Príncipe and Mi Amigo El Príncipe where Castro in which covers José José's songs whom Castro considers his musical idol. The album contains thirteen songs from both of the previous albums as well as two new covers: "Mi Vida" and "Pero Me Hiciste Tuyo". "Mi Vida" was released as a single on October 30, 2012 to promote the album. This is the last recording by Castro to be released under Universal Music Latin Entertainment as he left the record label to return with Sony Music.

Track listing
 Track listing provided by Allmusic.

Chart performance

References

José José tribute albums
2012 compilation albums
Cristian Castro compilation albums
Universal Music Latino compilation albums
Spanish-language compilation albums